Siratus cailletti, common name Caillet's murex, is a species of sea snail, a marine gastropod mollusk in the family Muricidae, the murex snails or rock snails. 

Several sources write the name of the species as Siratus cailleti.

Description
The size of an adult shell varies between 50 mm and 90 mm. with about half that length being the species' rather long siphonal canal.

A rare 'two-tailed' specimen of Siratus cailletti This oddity occurs when the siphonal canal associated with the previous varix fails to break away.

Distribution
This species occurs in the Caribbean Sea, the Gulf of Mexico and the Lesser Antilles; along the Bahamas. At Barbados this species has been trapped alive, in abundance, at depths from 450 – 550 ft. offshore the island's West coast. It is also known from similar depths off the island's South coast.

References

 Rosenberg, G., F. Moretzsohn, and E. F. García. 2009. Gastropoda (Mollusca) of the Gulf of Mexico, pp. 579–699 in Felder, D.L. and D.K. Camp (eds.), Gulf of Mexico–Origins, Waters, and Biota. Biodiversity. Texas A&M Press, College Station, Texas.
 Houart, R. (2014). Living Muricidae of the world. Muricinae. Murex, Promurex, Haustellum, Bolinus, Vokesimurex and Siratus. Harxheim: ConchBooks. 197 pp.

External links
 Petit de la Saussaye, S. (1856). Description de coquilles nouvelles. Journal de Conchyliologie. 5: 87-92, pl. 2.

Muricidae
Gastropods described in 1856